KMCL may refer to:

 Kerala Rapid Transit Corporation Ltd, a transportation company in India
 KMCL (AM), a defunct radio station, formerly licensed to Donnelly, Idaho, United States